Alfred H. Chapin Jr. (July 13, 1901 – January 1961) was an American tennis player.

Chapin grew up in Springfield, Massachusetts and was a graduate of Williams College. He reached the singles fourth round of the 1924 U.S. National Championships and made his best national ranking of 7th in 1926. His tournament finals included a straight sets win over Bill Tilden at the 1926 Connecticut Championships. He teamed up with Tilden to make the doubles final of the 1926 U.S. National Championships.

Outside of tennis, Chapin was a banker and served as director of the Western Massachusetts Bank, before relocating to California and working in floor coverings. He was married to tennis player Charlotte Hosmer.

Chapin is a member of the New England Tennis Hall of Fame.

Grand Slam finals

Doubles (1 runner-up)

References

External links
 

1903 births
1961 deaths
American male tennis players
Tennis people from Massachusetts
Williams College alumni
Sportspeople from Springfield, Massachusetts